The Yorkville Bank Building at 201–203 East 85th Street, 1511–1515 Third Avenue, Manhattan, New York City, was designed by Robert Maynicke. An example of Renaissance Revival architecture, it was built for the Yorkville Bank in 1905 and was designated a landmark by the New York City Landmarks Preservation Commission in 2012.

The building was operated as a bank until 1991, when it was converted to retail space on its ground floor and a fitness center on its upper floors.

See also
List of New York City Designated Landmarks in Manhattan from 59th to 110th Streets
National Register of Historic Places listings in Manhattan from 59th to 110th Streets

References

Bank buildings in Manhattan
Italian Renaissance Revival architecture in the United States
New York City Designated Landmarks in Manhattan
Commercial buildings in Manhattan
Renaissance Revival architecture in New York (state)
Upper East Side
Third Avenue
1905 establishments in New York City
Commercial buildings completed in 1905